The current Deputy Mayor of London for Policing and Crime is Sophie Linden. The office holder is head of the Mayor's Office for Policing and Crime.

Outside of powers to issue a Police and Crime Plan, and to appoint and remove senior Met officers, the role of Deputy Mayor for Policing & Crime (DMPC) in London is similar to that of an elected Police and Crime Commissioner (PCC) elsewhere.

Kit Malthouse was the first Deputy Mayor for Policing and Crime, taking on this role at the abolition of the Metropolitan Police Authority. On the re-election of Boris Johnson he was replaced by Stephen Greenhalgh.

List of Deputy Mayors for Policing and Crime

References

Local government in London